William Twomey (1931 – 14 August 2019), known as Liam Ó Tuama, was an Irish hurler and Gaelic footballer, Gaelic Athletic Association administrator and selector.

Playing career
Ó Tuama played hurling with Glen Rovers and Gaelic football with sister club St. Nicholas'. He was a member pf the Glen team that won the Cork JHC title in 1950 before later winning four Cork IHC titles in five seasons. Ó Tuama was goalkeeper on the Cork junior hurling team that beat Warwickshire in the 1955 All-Ireland junior final.

Management career
Ó Tuama held a number of administrative positions with the Glen Rovers club, including secretary, chairman and county board delegate. He was a  selector with the Cork senior hurling team that won the 1990 All-Ireland SHC.

Honours

Player
Glen Rovers
Cork Intermediate Hurling Championship: 1954, 1956, 1957, 1958
Cork Junior Hurling Championship: 1950

Cork
All-Ireland Junior Hurling Championship: 1950
Munster Junior Hurling Championship: 1950

Selector
All-Ireland Senior Hurling Championship: 1990
Munster Senior Hurling Championship: 1990

References

1931 births
2019 deaths
Dual players
Gaelic games club administrators
Glen Rovers hurlers
Hurling goalkeepers
Hurling selectors
St Nicholas' Gaelic footballers